Vladimir Aleksandrovich Kirsanov (Russian: Владимир Александрович Кирсанов; 1929–1995) was a Russian rower who represented the Soviet Union. He competed at the 1952 Summer Olympics in Helsinki with the men's coxless four where they were eliminated in the semi-final repechage.

References

1929 births
1995 deaths
Soviet male rowers
Olympic rowers of the Soviet Union
Rowers at the 1952 Summer Olympics